Aaron James Bummer (born September 21, 1993) is an American professional baseball pitcher for the Chicago White Sox of Major League Baseball (MLB).

Amateur career
Bummer attended Sunrise Mountain High School in Peoria, Arizona and was drafted by the New York Yankees in the 31st round of the 2011 MLB draft. He did not sign and played college baseball at the University of Nebraska–Lincoln.

In 2013, he played collegiate summer baseball with the Harwich Mariners of the Cape Cod Baseball League, and was named a league all-star.

In 2014, as a junior at Nebraska, he went 7–5 with a 3.34 ERA in 15 starts. After the season, he was drafted by the Chicago White Sox in the 19th round of the 2014 MLB draft.

Professional career

After signing with the White Sox, Bummer made his professional debut that same year with the Great Falls Voyagers where he compiled a 2.45 ERA in 22 innings pitched. He missed all of 2015 due to injury. In 2016, he pitched for the Arizona League White Sox, Great Falls, and Winston-Salem Dash where he was a combined 1–2 with a 4.86 ERA in 15 relief appearances between the two teams. He began 2017 with Winston-Salem, was promoted to the Birmingham Barons in May, and was promoted to the Charlotte Knights in July.

Chicago selected Bummer's contract on July 27, 2017, and he made his Major League debut that same night against the Chicago Cubs, striking out the first batter he faced, Anthony Rizzo. In 49 innings pitched between Winston-Salem, Birmingham and Charlotte prior to his call up, he was 1–5 with a 3.31 ERA. Bummer spent the remainder of 2017 with the White Sox, compiling a 1–3 record and 4.50 ERA in 30 relief appearances. In 2018, Bummer made 37 appearances, collecting an ERA of 4.26 in  innings. The following season, he improved dramatically, making 58 appearances while registering an ERA of 2.13 in  innings and striking out 60.  The White Sox signed him a five-year $16 million contract.

In 2020, Bummer only appeared in only nine games due to a left biceps strain that kept him out for a majority of the season. He was able to return for the final week of the season and was added to the White Sox' 2020 postseason roster.  He appeared in two games in the 2020 American League Wild Card Series, not allowing a run in  innings combined during Chicago's 2–1 series loss to the Oakland Athletics.

In 2021, Bummer appeared in 62 games with an ERA of 3.51 in 56.1 innings while striking out 75 batters.

Personal
Bummer earned his bachelor's degree in finance from Nebraska in December 2016. Bummer and his wife, Amber, married in 2018. They welcomed their first child, a daughter, in February 2021.

References

External links

1993 births
Living people
People from Valencia, Santa Clarita, California
Baseball players from California
Major League Baseball pitchers
Chicago White Sox players
Nebraska Cornhuskers baseball players
Harwich Mariners players
Great Falls Voyagers players
Arizona League White Sox players
Winston-Salem Dash players
Birmingham Barons players
Charlotte Knights players